Colombia–United Kingdom relations are the bilateral and diplomatic relations between Colombia and the United Kingdom. Colombian-Anglo relations begin in 1810, and stem from the end of the Napoleonic Wars in 1815 and the service of the British Legions who helped Colombia to win independence through Simón Bolívar's campaign to liberate New Granada in 1819–1820. However the first known English person to have traveled to modern day Colombia was Sir Walter Raleigh in 1595.

Country comparison

Background
Major interest in Colombia for the UK has lain in environmental protection and for Colombia the direct financial investment from the UK, military assistance, and gas production. Bilateral trade currently stands at £1 Billion.

History

Early contact with the area known today as Colombia began in the 16th century with the limited expeditionary forces of Elizabeth I's privateers, most famously in the search for the mythical city of El Dorado. Until the early modern period British maritime activity, exploration and trade was limited to these skirmishes in the Caribbean such as the Battle of San Juan de Ulúa (1568), which would lead to the Anglo-Spanish War (1585–1604) and other successive Anglo-Spanish wars in the area.

By the 17th century the British began to become interested in the South American continent due to these trade and naval rivalries with Spain, with the British fighting Spain over a european regional conflict resulting in their defeat in the War of Jenkins' Ear (1739 to 1748), which lead to the British withdrawing to focus naval efforts on their North American wars (1775-1783) and resulting in the Anglo-Spanish War in the Americas (1779–1783). British maritime activity in the late 1790s became more aggressive and began actively gaining territory in the Caribbean (see Trinidad) to enable greater British mercantile trade in the area. At the time, they also furthered their interest against Spain, (see the Black Legend). Looking to gain independence, the Spanish-American Junta Caracas was the first Junta to engage in diplomacy to gain ties to Great Britain.

In June 1810 Simon Bolivar travelled to London with Lois Lopez Mendez and Andrés Bello to explain why the junta of Caracas broke relations with the Spanish Monarchy; to the British Foreign Office; seeking British naval and diplomatic protection, however the Spanish ambassador on the grounds Bolivar had at the time no diplomatic capacity to demand self-rule, engaged the British Foreign Office to turn Bolivar away. Bolivar instead returned to Venezuela and his entourage stayed behind in Somers Town, London, and in the following years did not gain further in their activities due to the fluctuation and instability of the parties and states they represented. Their case was also not helped by how in-flux the first statehoods of Venezuela were also viewed by the British as being too unstable to consider offering support to. But in a bid to engage British assistance, Colombian and Cartagena officials began to trade with British Caribbean colonial officials, failing to attract any substantial aid. However local naval trade did increase between British Caribbean Naval officials and Venezuela and New Granada, coming into the British sphere of influence.

By 1814, the United Province of New Granada sent José Maria del Real as an envoy to London for British support against Spanish military intervention, but as part of a long delay tactics on Britains part due to the defeat of Napoleon and the return of Fernando VII's restoration, Britain did not immediately recognise the new states representatives, denying requests for British assistance against Spanish attack by the Spanish General Morillo in 1815. Cartagena even declared itself a British dominion, but was denied the request eventually falling back under Spanish control by 1816. However Bolivar, exiled in Jamaica in 1815, wrote to Richard Wellesley, asking for military support against Spain, yet this was ignored based on the foreign policy of the British Foreign secretary Mr. Castlereagh who was aiming to keep the peace amongst the French, Spanish and European powers following a fine tightrope which British foreign policy makers walked in regards to South America after the close of the Napoleonic wars, culminating in the 1814–1815 Grand Alliance, under which France supported Spain keeping its American colonies, and thus Castelreagh supported Britain supporting Spanish rule in the Americas. However around this time Mendez had begun recruiting what became the British Legions, over 7,000 ex-military Irish and Englishmen who had been dismissed after the Napoleonic wars ended; who went on to fight for Colombian Independence.

The British Government on paper however were still in support of Spain in official channels, apart from a number of liberal politicians, but British public favour went with Colombian patriots and favoured pressuring government to open new trade markets with these newly formed Spanish American groups in 1817 and 1818. However, by 1822 at the Congress of Verona, Castlereagh shifted position to favour Colombian independence, after the accession of British interest to the Western Question, due to the fluctuating relations with regards to the French Empire and its interests and power relations with the Spanish Empire. With the independence of several Spanish colonies such as Mexico and Peru between 1817 - 1821, and the success of Bolivars armies in the North South-Americas and in 1824 with the signing of the United States-Colombia Trade agreement, the UK under George Canning eventually recognised the Colombian state in 1825.

Canning in the House of Commons defended his policies regarding France, Spain and Spanish America in a speech stating: “I resolved that if France had Spain it should not be Spain with the Indies. I called the New World into existence to redress the balance of the Old” - 12 December 1826

In the later half of the 19th century British merchants came to the area for the Coffee which in this century has become an important import once more. Steamships and steam trains began to be invested in the 1870s–1890s by English merchants and the Colombian government to transport goods such as Bananas, tobacco, coffee and European imports, which proved to create a flourishing community of British expats in Colombia and spread out across the South Americas. The British expat community later controlled a portion of the railways in Colombia such as the Cartagena Railway line, the Colombian Northern Railway and the Southern Bogota Railway line by 1906, with all railways returning to Colombian ownership by the 1930s.

Chronology of Colombian–British relations

Early
 1565 - The slave trader John Hawkins attempts to trade in enslaved peoples from Sierra Leone with local peoples in Riohacha
 1586 - Battle of Cartagena occurs, with Francis Drake capturing the strategic settlement of Cartagena
 1595 - Raleigh's El Dorado Expedition for the city El Dorado takes place with the crew travelling the Orinoco River in modern day Colombia, with two Englishman left behind with local Indian chiefs, to whom he exhibited a portrait of Queen Elizabeth and promised to return and liberate them from Spanish dominion ... [whom were] promptly arrested by the Spanish colonial [authorities], who warned local chiefs to only trade with the Spanish 
 1596 - Francis Drake ransacks the city of Riohacha, sailing away with 100 slaves as part of his booty
 1617 - Watt Raleigh with an expedition traverses the Orinoco, until he was killed in a battle with the Spanish
 1660-1668 - Henry Morgan operated a smuggling trade from Jamaica via Riohacha 
 1679 - Gorgona is visited by Bartholomew Sharp
 1709 - Gorgorna Island is home to Woodes Rogers and William Dampier
 1739-1748 - Battle of Cartagena de Indias occurs due to British mercantile expansionism in South Americas, with Britain withdrawing to North America not to return to the area until the 1790s
 1758 - Battle of Cartagena whereby the British blockaded the French in the port of Cartagena occurs during the North American Seven Years War
 1808 - First Masonic Lodge is founded in Cartagena where José Maria Garcia-Toledo and members discussed European politics and history based on the broadsheets (Jamaica Courier and the Royal Gazette) and publications produced in Kingston, Jamaica
 1810 - Bolivar travels to London
 1815 - British Cartagenas de Indias is declared and fails, but Annual trade with Spain is replaced by trade between Colombia and British Jamaica via the Treaty of Utrecht in the Atlantic slave trade
Colombian Independence
 1817 - Daniel Florence O'Leary, James Rooke, Thomas Charles Wright & Juan Illingworth Hunt enlist under Bolivar
 1819 - Battle of Vargas Swamp
 1822 - Francisco Antonio Zea dies in London, and a large amount of British private investment is made in the new state
 1823 - Mary English known as the Belle of Bogota resides in Bogotá from 1823 - 1827 being the representative of financial creditors Herring & Richardson
 March 1823 - John Potter Hamilton ESP the diplomat arrives in Gran Colombia, his 1827 narrative is notable for its depictions of free black men (bogas), such as Agustín Agualongo and women in Colombia

 1824 - Bolivar leases the Aroa mines to generate revenue to fight the Spanish in the wars of Independence
 1825 - Colombian Independence of Gran Colombia recognised by United Kingdom in first South American envoy recognised by European state
 1826 - The London stock market crashes reducing the already small number of private brokers willing to invest in what is now considered as a risky financial investment
 1827-1830 - José Fernández Madrid lives in London
 1865 - The American jurist Florence Gonzalez translates John Stuart Mill's Considerations on Representative Government
 1869 - The historic railway of Ferrocarril de Bolívar based in Puerto Colombia is opened with the backing of British Businessman in Colombia
 1881 - Rosa Carnegie-Williams travels to Bogota, publishing her travel writing account A year in the Andes; or, A lady's adventures in Bogotá in 1889, which were published into Spanish in 1987
 1882 - The English merchant Robert A Joy (1818-?) and the Colombian Manuel J. de Mier funded the Santa Marta Railway in 1882-1906 to connect Bogota with the Magdalena River, and by 1906 reached its longest length of 94 kilometers stretching to Fundación, mostly delivering Bananas
 1889 - Samuel Smiles Self-Help is published and put into circulation in Colombia, used from 1891 - 1912 to further the goal of the education of the Colombian working classes
Modern
 1938 - Jaime Jaramillo Arango arrives in Europe, where he is witness to Kristallnacht, the Blitz and becomes the Colombian Ambassador to the UK between (1938;)1943 - 1945
 1940 - The British Council establish English examinations in Colombia.
 1955 - Cricket in Colombia became more institutionally recognised on 20 May 1955 with the creation of the Bogotá Cricket Club (BCC) whose first chairman of the club was the Englishman Reginald Brand alongside and Indian Rishiraj Patel.
 1956 - Arango establishes the Anglo Colombian School in Bogotá
 1959 - Alfonso López Pumarejo dies in London, with Mass being attended in his name at Westminster Cathedral
 1961 - Elizabeth Masson founds the Colegio de Inglaterra
 1975 - Sebastian Snow crosses the Darién Gap with the Canadian Wade Davis in 1975 as part of his unbroken walk from Tierra del Fuego to Costa Rica, with the trip documented in The Rucksack Man (1976) and Davis's The Serpent and the Rainbow (1985)
 1978-1981 - Aline Helg travels between England and Colombia to write her 1987 work La educación en Colombia, 1918-1957: una historia social, económica y política
 1982 - Colombia backs UK in the Falkland Islands sovereignty dispute
 1987 - David Wood (1951–?) author of An Englishman in Colombia (2013) visits Colombia
 1980's - SAS train Colombian special forces in counter-narcotics
 2003 - David Hutchinson the banker was kidnapped by FARC for 10 months residing in the Andes
 2011 - Steve Cossey purchases and restores the No.8 Baldwin 1921 steam train, purportedly "the oldest operational steam engine in Colombia".
 2015 - Mike Slee releases the nature Documentary Colombia: Wild Magic
 2016 - Colombian President Juan Manuel Santos visits UK on a state visit.
 2017 - Levison Woods walks through 1,700 miles across South America for Channel 4 for the programme Walking the Americas
 2020 - June 16 - Bilateral trade agreement between two reached for post-Brexit

Britons in Colombia
 
 Jorge Isaacs
 Augustus Henry Mounsey - British Columbia Diplomat beginning in 1881
 George Saunders - Footballer who plays for Envigado F.C.

Colombians in the United Kingdom

 Steven Alzate
 Adam Garcia
 Sisco Gomez
 Tara Hoyos-Martínez
 Manuel José Hurtado
 Cristian Montaño
 Fernando Montaño
 Ian Poveda
 Courtney Webb

List of Ambassadors in United Kingdom to Colombia

Resident diplomatic missions
 Colombia has an embassy and a consulate-general in London.
 United Kingdom has an embassy in Bogotá.

See also

 Latin America–United Kingdom relations
 Colombians in the United Kingdom
 Foreign relations of Colombia
 Foreign relations of the United Kingdom
 Right-wing paramilitarism in Colombia
 British intervention in Spanish American independence

References

Colombia–United Kingdom relations
Bilateral relations of the United Kingdom
United Kingdom